Rasbora everetti is a species of ray-finned fish in the genus Rasbora. It is endemic to the Philippines.

References 

Freshwater fish of the Philippines
Rasboras
Taxa named by George Albert Boulenger
Fish described in 1895